Murex megapex is a species of large predatory sea snail, a marine gastropod mollusk in the family Muricidae, the rock snails or murex snails.

References

 Neubert, E. (1998). Six new species of marine gastropods from the Red Sea and the Gulf of Aden. i>Fauna of Arabia 17: 463-472

Gastropods described in 1998
Murex